Harpalus baleensis is a species of ground beetle in the subfamily Harpalinae. It was described by Clarke in 1973.

References

baleensis
Beetles described in 1973